The 1912 South Dakota gubernatorial election was held on November 5, 1912. Incumbent Republican Governor Robert S. Vessey declined to run for re-election to a third term. Lieutenant Governor Frank M. Byrne won the Republican primary to succeed Vessey, and then faced State Senator Edwin S. Johnson, the Democratic nominee, in the general election. Byrne only narrowly defeated Johnson, winning just 49% of the vote to Johnson's 46%, the closest gubernatorial election since 1898.

Primary elections
Primary elections were held on June 4, 1912.

Democratic primary

Candidates
 Edwin S. Johnson, former State Senator
 P. F. Wickhem, former State Senator

Results

Republican primary

Candidates
 Frank M. Byrne, Lieutenant Governor of South Dakota
 George W. Egan, disbarred attorney, 1910 Republican candidate for Governor
 Loomis S. Cull, Registrar of the Rapid City United States Land Office

Results

Prohibition primary

Candidates
 O. W. Butterfield, Prohibition candidate for Governor in 1910

Results

Socialist primary

Candidates
 Samuel Lovett

Results

General election

Candidates
Edwin S. Johnson, Democratic
Frank M. Byrne, Republican
O. W. Butterfield, Prohibition
Samuel Lovett, Socialist

Results

References

1912
South Dakota
Gubernatorial
November 1912 events in the United States